Komunalni center Hall is a multi-purpose indoor arena located in Domžale, Slovenia. It has a capacity for 2,500 spectators and is mostly used for basketball games. The main tenant is basketball club Helios Suns Domžale.

It was renovated and expanded in multiple stages. The biggest renovations happened in 2004 and in 2007, when the hall reached its final capacity of 2,500.

Gallery

External links

KK Domžale official website 

Indoor arenas in Slovenia
Sports venues completed in 1967